Ute or UTE may refer to:

 Ute (band), an Australian jazz group
 Ute (given name)
 Ute (sponge), a sponge genus
 Ute (vehicle), an Australian and New Zealand term for certain utility vehicles
 Ute, Iowa, a city in Monona County along the Soldier River
 Ute Mountain, Colorado
 Ute Mountain, New Mexico
 Ute Pass, a mountain pass west of Colorado Springs
 Ute people, a Native American people
 Ute dialect, spoken by the Ute people
 634 Ute, a minor planet orbiting the sun
 Holden Ute, an Australian coupe utility
 Utah Utes, the University of Utah athletic teams
 UTE (Usinas y Terminales Eléctricas), Uruguay's government-owned power company

See also 
Utes (disambiguation)